Bebearia cocalia, the common palm forester, is a butterfly in the family Nymphalidae. It is found in Guinea, Guinea-Bissau, Sierra Leone, Liberia, Ivory Coast, Ghana, Togo, Nigeria, Cameroon, Gabon, the Republic of the Congo, Angola, the Democratic Republic of the Congo, Uganda, Kenya, Tanzania and Zambia. The habitat consists of forests, particularly riparian forests.

Adults are attracted to fermented bananas.

The larvae feed on palm trees.

Subspecies
B. c. cocalia (south-western Guinea, Guinea-Bissau, Sierra Leone, Liberia, Ivory Coast, Ghana)
B. c. badiana (Rebel, 1914) (Democratic Republic of the Congo: Kivu, western Uganda, north-western Tanzania, western and central Kenya)
B. c. continentalis Hecq, 1988 (Ghana: the Volta region, Togo, western Nigeria)
B. c. katera (van Someren, 1939) (eastern Nigeria, Cameroon, Gabon, Congo, northern Angola, Democratic Republic of the Congo, western Uganda, western Tanzania, western Zambia)

References

Butterflies described in 1793
cocalia